Sebotk (also known as Seh Botk) is a village in Toghrol Al Jerd Rural District, Toghrol Al Jerd District, Kuhbanan County, Kerman Province, Iran. At the 2006 census, its population was 119, in 30 families.

References 

Populated places in Kuhbanan County